KTSO (100.9 FM) is a radio station licensed to Sapulpa, Oklahoma that serves the greater Tulsa area broadcasting a soft oldies format. It is part of the Stephens Media Group (no relation to the newspaper owner) and has been on the air since 1977. Its studios are located at the CityPlex Towers in South Tulsa.

Radio tower 

KTSO broadcasts from a tower between Glenpool and Sapulpa, off Highway 75. The tower was constructed in 2014, while the station was still KXOJ-FM, and was part of an FCC granted class C3 upgrade, increasing the station to an ERP of 19,000 watts. The new signal also includes an HD signal that covers the Tulsa metro area.

Previously, KXOJ operated from a 361-foot tower near Sapulpa, operating at only 5,000 watts. Several inner-ring Tulsa suburbs such as Broken Arrow, Claremore and Okmulgee only got a grade B signal.

History

Before August 16, 2016, 100.9 FM's call sign was KXOJ-FM. Every morning between 6 and 10am KXOJ-FM's on-air lineup included Dave Weston and Katie Rindt. Other veteran announcers included Bob Michaels, joined the station in 1998, and Gary Thompson 3pm to 7pm, who began intermittently working there in the early 1990s. After many years in morning drive, Heather Miles moved to the 10a to 3p shift in January 2016.

Despite the signal limitations, KXOJ won three Dove Awards as Station of the Year.

In 2016, Stephens Media purchased KTSO at 100.9 FM. Starting on August 16, 2016 at 7:30, the KXOJ-FM call sign and format moved to 94.1 FM after 39 years of broadcasting at 100.9 FM. The move allowed KXOJ to move to KTSO's more powerful tower in west Tulsa, broadcasting at a full 100,000 watts–a near 400-fold increase.  100.9 FM changed call letters to KTSO and began stunting with a recorded announcement redirecting listeners to 94.1 FM.

On August 31, 2016, at 9 a.m., KTSO began stunting with Tulsa-related music. At 11 a.m., the stunt shifted to a loop of The Gap Band's "You Dropped a Bomb on Me". At noon, KTSO flipped to All-80s Hits as "Totally Awesome 80's 100.9", launching with 1,980 songs commercial free. The first song under the format was "We Are The World" by USA for Africa.

On October 20, 2020, at 3 p.m., the “Totally Awesome 80s” format moved to translator 94.5 K233AU, which rebroadcasts KTSO's HD-2 sub-channel. At the same time, KTSO flipped to “Tulsa’s Soft Oldies”, focusing on music from the 1970s through the 1990s; the first song under the format was "Reminiscing" by the Little River Band.

In November 2022, KTSO switched to Christmas music for the holiday season, marking the return to holiday music on Tulsa radio since KTGX-HD2 began stunting as "Christmas 93.5" in 2018.

HD Programming

KTSO is licensed by the FCC to broadcast in the HD hybrid format.

The HD2 subchannel simulcasts on translator K233AU (94.5 FM) in Tulsa, and broadcast the former '80s Hits format that was on the main signal; it was branded as "Totally Awesome 80's". On February 22, 2022, KTSO-HD2/K233AU flipped back to Christian CHR as "NOW 94.5".

Translator

Previous logo

References

External links

TSO
Oldies radio stations in the United States